Puigpelat is a municipality in the comarca of Alt Camp, province of Tarragona, Catalonia, Spain.

References

External links
 Government data pages 

Municipalities in Alt Camp
Populated places in Alt Camp